Swinstead is a village and civil parish in the South Kesteven district of Lincolnshire, England. It is a village of just over 100 households, the population of the civil parish being measured at 234 in the 2011 census.

Swinstead parish church is dedicated to St Mary. Adjacent villages include Creeton, Swayfield and Grimsthorpe.

In William Shakespeare's King John, King John stayed in "Swinsted Abbey", but it is Swineshead Abbey that he stayed: this confusion was common in late-sixteenth century texts, for Swinstead is about 25 miles from Swineshead.

References

External links

 (alternatively Swinstead Old Hall), a 19th-century farm and farm buildings, to the west on the Grimsthorpe Estate.

"Swinstead", Genuki.org.uk. Retrieved 11 May 2012
Swinstead – aerial view

Villages in Lincolnshire
Civil parishes in Lincolnshire
South Kesteven District